Chester High School is a public high school in Chester, Illinois, United States.

Athletics 
Football - boys (freshman, junior varsity, varsity)
Volleyball - girls (freshman, junior varsity, varsity)
Cross country - boys and girls (varsity)
Golf - boys and girls (varsity)
Cheerleading - boys and girls (varsity)
Trapshooting - boys and girls (varsity)
Baseball - boys (junior varsity, varsity)
Softball - girls (varsity)
Track - boys and girls (varsity)
Basketball - girls (junior varsity, varsity)  boys (freshman, junior varsity, varsity)
Dance - Coed (varsity)

References 

Chester High School Summit Yearbook 2009
www.chester139.com

Public high schools in Illinois
Schools in Randolph County, Illinois